TV10 would have been the first official Dutch commercial TV channel airing in the Netherlands. The launch date was set on 1 November 1989. The TV Station was a cooperation between Peter Jelgersma and Joop van den Ende. The Dutch government was, at the time, against commercial television and prohibited it from broadcasting. The channel would have been a general entertainment channel. Eventually, most programs and television celebrities from TV10 moved to competitors RTL Véronique (now known as RTL 4) which had launched under a Luxembourgian television licence.

References 

Defunct television channels in the Netherlands
Television channels and stations established in 1989
Television channels and stations disestablished in 1989